The  Tampa Bay Storm season was the 27th season for the franchise in the Arena Football League, and their 23rd in the Tampa Bay area. The team was coached by Lawrence Samuels, following his promotion from offensive coordinator. They played their home games at the Tampa Bay Times Forum. Finishing the regular season with an 8–10 record, the Storm failed to reach the playoffs for the third time in four seasons.

Standings

Schedule
The Storm began the season by hosting the New Orleans VooDoo on March 14. They ended the regular season at home against the Cleveland Gladiators.

Roster

References

Tampa Bay Storm
Tampa Bay Storm seasons
Tampa Bay Storm